Hundred Regiments Offensive
 Aug 20 – Dec 5, 1940

China 

8th Route Army – Deputy Commander Peng Dehuai
 129th Division
 47 regiments
 120th Division
 22 regiments
 115th Division
 46 regiments

Total: 115 Regiments, variously estimated between 70,000 and 300,000 men. Actual communist strike regiments exerted to the campaign would total about 22 regiments.

Japan 

Japanese Northern China Area Army – Lieutenant General Hayao Tada
 15th Independent Mixed Brigade [ Hebei, Peiking area]
 27th Division [ Hebei, Tientsin area]
 7th Independent Mixed Brigade [ Shandong, Huimin area]
 110th Division [Hebei, Baoding area]
 8th Independent Mixed Brigade [Hebei, Shijiazhuang area] - Major General Mizuhara  
 1st Independent Mixed Brigade [Hebei, Handan area]
 Mongolian Army [HQ: Chahar, Zhangjiakou]
 26th Division [ Suiyuan, Datong area]
 2nd Independent Mixed Brigade [Chahar, Zhangjiakou area]
 1st Army  [ Shanxi, Taiyuan]
 36th Division [Shanxi, Lu'an area]
 3rd Independent Mixed Brigade [Shanxi, Shanheng (山亨) county area]
 4th Independent Mixed Brigade [Shanxi, Yangquan area] - Lieutenant General Katayama  
 9th Independent Mixed Brigade [Shanxi, Taiyuan area]
 41st Division [Shanxi, Linfen area]

Collaborationist Chinese forces
  ?

Notes

Sources 
  Tetsuya Kataoka, Resistance and Revolution in China, The Communists and the Second United Front, UNIVERSITY OF CALIFORNIA PRESS, Berkeley, Los Angeles, Oxford
   The Battle of One Hundred Regiments
 [2]  抗日战争时期的侵华日军序列沿革 (Order of battle of the Japanese army that invaded China during the Sino Japanese War)
 [3]  RESISTANCE WARS: Hundred Regiment Campaign

Hundred Regiments
Hundred Regiments